Alexei Aleksandrovich Yefimov (born 15 February 1988) is a Russian professional ice hockey player. He is currently playing with Avtomobilist Yekaterinburg of the Kontinental Hockey League (KHL)

Yefimov made his Kontinental Hockey League debut playing with Metallurg Novokuznetsk during the 2012–13 KHL season.

References

External links

1988 births
Living people
Admiral Vladivostok players
Avtomobilist Yekaterinburg players
Ice hockey people from Moscow
Krylya Sovetov Moscow players
Metallurg Novokuznetsk players
Russian ice hockey left wingers